Huanghejingqu railway station is a station on Zhengzhou–Jiaozuo intercity railway. The station is located on the south bank of the Yellow River, in Huiji District, Zhengzhou, Henan, China.

Station layout
The station has 2 side platforms and 4 tracks. The station building is to the west of the platforms.

References

Railway stations in Henan
Railway stations in Zhengzhou
Stations on the Zhengzhou–Jiaozuo intercity railway
Railway stations in China opened in 2015